The City of Thi is a fictional city in the Winkie Country of the Land of Oz, from the Oz Books by L. Frank Baum. Thi appears in the book The Lost Princess of Oz.

Area
Thi is in a relatively unexplored area of Oz. The fields surrounding it tend to shift, turning a traveler in the opposite direction. Surrounding Thi is a huge field of prickly thistles. Beyond the thistle field is an illusory wall surrounding the city.

People
The inhabitants of the city of Thi are called Thists. They have diamond shaped heads and heart shaped bodies. Their hair is in a little bunch at the top point of their heads, and have large round eyes, and noses and mouths that are very small. Their stomachs and throats are lined with gold allowing them to eat the thistles that grow around their city.

Government
Since the City of Thi is within the borders of the country of Oz, it is under the jurisdiction of Ozma. However, being so isolated, the citizens of Thi know nothing of her. They believe themselves to have no king but in reality their king is the High Coco-Lorum, a public servant who solves civil disputes by making up laws. The people are unaware of his leadership and content in their ignorance, and he is able to get them to do whatever he wants.

Miscellaneous
The city specializes in building mechanical dragons to pull their chariots.  These can only operate when loud music is played.  Likely, this was inspired by Fafner in Richard Wagner's Siegfried.

Quote
"They seemed happy and content, and those who are contented have nothing to regret and nothing to wish for" - The Wizard

Thi